The Norwegian Exhibition was held in Sweden in 1943 to raise awareness of Norwegian culture and history in Sweden. 

It was chaired by Hans Wilhelmsson Ahlmann.

Opening
The Stockholm exhibition was opened by Prince Eugen, Duke of Närke with Princess Ingeborg of Denmark, the Swedish Foreign Minister Christian Günther, the Norwegian envoy Jens Bull, ambassadors for the Allied nations, and representatives of Stockholm in attendance.

Exhibits
Art works displayed included paintings by Christian Krohg, Per Krohg and Edvard Munch, and statues by Gustav Vigeland. 

There were statues of Olaf II of Norway (with a label saying HELLIG OLAV NORGES EVIGE KONGE) and of Norwegian explorer Fridtjof Nansen, and a photograph of the King of Norway Haakon VII of Norway at the time in exile in Britain.

9 April
On 9 April 1943, three years after the start of the German occupation of Norway there was a memorial service to commemorate Norwegian nationals who had died fighting the occupation. at which Yngve Larsson and the Stockholm governor Torsten Nothin laid wreaths at a plaque saying Vi hyllar de norska patrioterna som offrade sina liv för Norges frihet.

References

Translations

1943 in Sweden
World's fairs in Stockholm